Puerulus, commonly known as whip lobsters, is a genus of spiny lobsters in the family Palinuridae, native to the Indo-Pacific at depths of 200 to 700 meters.

Species
 Puerulus angulatus Bate, 1888 (Holthuis 1991; Chan 2010) Banded whip lobster
 Puerulus carinatus Borradaile, 1910 Red whip lobster
 Puerulus gibbosus Chan, Ma & Chu, 2013 
 Puerulus mesodontus Chan, Ma & Chu, 2013
 Puerulus quadridentis Chan, Ma & Chu, 2013
 Puerulus richeri Chan, Ma & Chu, 2013
 Puerulus sericus Chan, Ma & Chu, 2013
 Puerulus sewelli Ramadan, 1938 Arabian whip lobster
 Puerulus velutinus Holthuis, 1963 Velvet whip lobster

References

Achelata
Decapod genera
Taxa named by Arnold Edward Ortmann